Mayskoye is a rural locality (a village) in Verkhnetroitsky Selsoviet, Tuymazinsky District, Bashkortostan, Russia. The population was 48 as of 2010. There are 4 streets.

Geography 
Mayskoye is located 29 km south of Tuymazy (the district's administrative centre) by road. Verkhnetroitskoye is the nearest rural locality.

References 

Rural localities in Tuymazinsky District